A list of animated feature films that were first released in 1972.

See also
 List of animated television series of 1972

References

Feature films
1972
1972-related lists